James Stevens Fraser Shepherd (29 February 1892 in Reefton – 11 July 1970 in Dunedin) was a New Zealand cricketer who played first-class cricket for Otago from 1913 to 1931. He played five times for New Zealand in the days before New Zealand played Test cricket.

See also
 List of Otago representative cricketers

References

External links

1892 births
1970 deaths
New Zealand cricketers
Pre-1930 New Zealand representative cricketers
Otago cricketers
People from Reefton
Sportspeople from the West Coast, New Zealand